Alsophila henryi, synonym Cyathea henryi, is a species of tree fern native to India and Yunnan in China, where it grows submontane and montane forest at an altitude of 600–1200 m. The trunk of this plant is erect and may be 5–7 m tall or more. Fronds are bi- or tripinnate and usually 2–3 m in length. The rachis is smooth and dark, but occasionally has a few scattered scales. The stipe also has these scales. The scales are either small and pale with irregular fringed edges, or large and dark with a paler margin. Sori are borne on minor veins and lack indusia.

The specific epithet henryi commemorates Irish botanist Augustine Henry (1857-1930), who collected numerous plants in China.

References

henryi
Ferns of India
Taxa named by John Gilbert Baker